Enayatollah Bakhshi (also known Enayat Bakhshi) is an Iranian veteran actor. During six decades of artistic activity, he has appeared in more than 170 plays and considered one of the most well-known actors played the antihero role in the history of Iranian cinema. He is cooperated with some of the notable Iranian film directors, including Ebrahim Golestan, Bahram Beyzai, Ali Hatami, Amir Naderi, Masoud Kimiai, Dariush Mehrjoui and Davood Mirbagheri. He has received a First Grade Certificate in Art (equivalent to PhD) from the Ministry of Culture and Islamic Guidance of Iran.

Bakhshi has taken part in many movies, including Mr. Naive (1970), Sattar Khan (1972), Tangna (1973), Tangsir (1973), The Deer (1974), Senator (1983), Travellers (1991), The Fateful Day (1994), and Killing Mad Dogs (2000). He has also taken part in various TV series, such as The First Man (1976), Sarbadars (1984), Imam Ali (1991), Heroes Don't Die (1997), and Tabriz in Fog (2010).

Life and career
Bakhshi was born on March 27, 1945 in Taleqan, a city west of Tehran. He taught acting from Hamid Samandarian in the young age. In 1959, he began his acting career with the National Art Group, headed by Abbas Javanmard. After two years with the group, he joined Imperial Iranian Air Force and subsequent to taking several electronics and English courses, he began teaching in the two fields.

After 10 years of serving the armed forces, he became employed by the Department of Theatre and began his artistic activity.

In 1970, he married with Simin Bazarjani. She is the screenwriter of Iranian movies such as My Daughter Sahar (1989) and Bat (1997). Bakhshi lives in Tehran and he has two children.

Selected filmography
 Mr. Naive (1970)
 Sattar Khan (1972)
 Tangna (1973)
 Tangsir (1973)
 The Ghost Valley's Treasure Mysteries (1974)
 The Deer (1974)
 The Falconet (1975)
 Safe Place (1977)
 Flying in a Cage (1978)
 Senator (1983)
 Struggle (1985)
 Train (1988)
 Travellers (1991)
 The Devoted (1991)
 The Victim (1991)
 Enfejar Dar Otaghe Amal (1992)
 Love-stricken (1992)
 The Fateful Day (1994)
 Enemy (1995)
 Sharareh (1999)
 The Visitor of Rey (2000)
 Killing Mad Dogs (2000) 
 Good Friends (2015)

Selected tv series
 The First Man (1976)
 Sarbadars (1984)
 Avicenna (1985)
 Shaheed-e-Kufa (1991)
 The Hidden Half of the Moon (1994)
 Heroes Don't Die (1997)
 A Place of Love (2000)
 The Young Officer (2001)
 Reyhaneh (2005)
 Zire Tigh (2006)
 Tabriz in Fog (2010)
 A Piece of Land (2012) 
 Breach (2013)
 The Enigma of the Shah (2014–2016)
 Hast'o Nist (2018)

References

External links
 

1945 births
Living people
Iranian male stage actors
Iranian male film actors